Lars-Jørgen Salvesen (born 19 February 1996) is a Norwegian football striker who plays for Viking FK.

Career
He started his career in FK Vigør, and played for the senior team in the 2013 Norwegian Third Division before joining IK Start. He then made his Tippeligaen debut in August 2014 as a last-minute substitute against Sogndal. In August 2018 Salvesen joined Ullensaker/Kisa on a 1,5 years contract.

Salvesen signed with Sarpsborg on 17 January 2019 for three years. 

Salvesen signed a three-and-a-half-year contract with Bodø/Glimt on 27 July 2022.

On 7 March 2023, he signed a four-year contract with Viking.

Career statistics

Club

References

External links

1996 births
Living people
Sportspeople from Kristiansand
Norwegian footballers
Norway youth international footballers
FK Vigør players
IK Start players
Ullensaker/Kisa IL players
Sarpsborg 08 FF players
Strømsgodset Toppfotball players
FK Bodø/Glimt players
Viking FK players
Eliteserien players
Norwegian First Division players
Association football forwards